The Central Fire Station in Jackson, Mississippi, located on S. President St., was built in 1904.  It was listed on the National Register of Historic Places in 1975.

It was designed by architect P.H. Weathers.

References

Fire stations in Mississippi
National Register of Historic Places in Jackson, Mississippi
Fire stations completed in 1904
1904 establishments in Mississippi